Deportivo (Spanish, 'sporting') may refer to:

 Deportivo de La Coruña, commonly known as simply Deportivo, a Spanish football club 
 Déportivo, a French rock band
 Deportivo (Mexicable), an aerial lift station in Ecatepec, Mexico
 Deportivo station, in San Juan agglomeration, Puerto Rico

See also